The Braille pattern dots-12356 is a 6-dot braille cell with the top left, both middle, and both bottom dots raised, or an 8-dot braille cell with the top left, both upper-middle, and both lower-middle dots raised. It is represented by the Unicode code point U+2837, and in Braille ASCII with the open parenthesis: (.

Unified Braille

In unified international braille, the braille pattern dots-12356 is used to represent a voiced pharyngeal fricative, i.e. /ʕ/, or otherwise as needed.

Table of unified braille values

Other braille

Plus dots 7 and 8

Related to Braille pattern dots-12356 are Braille patterns 123567, 123568, and 1235678, which are used in 8-dot braille systems, such as Gardner-Salinas and Luxembourgish Braille.

Related 8-dot kantenji patterns

In the Japanese kantenji braille, the standard 8-dot Braille patterns 23678, 123678, 234678, and 1234678 are the patterns related to Braille pattern dots-12356, since the two additional dots of kantenji patterns 012356, 123567, and 0123567 are placed above the base 6-dot cell, instead of below, as in standard 8-dot braille.

Kantenji using braille patterns 23678, 123678, 234678, or 1234678

This listing includes kantenji using Braille pattern dots-12356 for all 6349 kanji found in JIS C 6226-1978.

  - 耳

Variants and thematic compounds

  -  selector 3 + み/耳  =  襄
  -  selector 4 + み/耳  =  哉
  -  selector 5 + み/耳  =  禹
  -  selector 6 + み/耳  =  呂
  -  み/耳 + selector 1  =  身
  -  み/耳 + selector 2  =  足
  -  比 + み/耳  =  南
  -  し/巿 + み/耳  =  緑

Compounds of 耳

  -  み/耳 + み/耳 + み/耳  =  聶
  -  囗 + み/耳  =  囁
  -  て/扌 + み/耳  =  摂
  -  て/扌 + て/扌 + み/耳  =  攝
  -  る/忄 + み/耳 + み/耳  =  懾
  -  か/金 + 宿 + み/耳  =  鑷
  -  お/頁 + 宿 + み/耳  =  顳
  -  も/門 + み/耳  =  聞
  -  ゆ/彳 + み/耳  =  聳
  -  心 + み/耳  =  茸
  -  く/艹 + み/耳  =  葺
  -  む/車 + み/耳  =  輯
  -  み/耳 + ゑ/訁  =  取
  -  み/耳 + て/扌  =  撮
  -  ふ/女 + み/耳 + ゑ/訁  =  娶
  -  て/扌 + み/耳 + ゑ/訁  =  掫
  -  え/訁 + み/耳 + ゑ/訁  =  諏
  -  む/車 + み/耳 + ゑ/訁  =  輙
  -  さ/阝 + み/耳 + ゑ/訁  =  陬
  -  そ/馬 + み/耳 + ゑ/訁  =  驟
  -  み/耳 + 心  =  恥
  -  み/耳 + 氷/氵  =  敢
  -  心 + み/耳 + 氷/氵  =  橄
  -  め/目 + み/耳 + 氷/氵  =  瞰
  -  み/耳 + さ/阝  =  耶
  -  て/扌 + み/耳 + さ/阝  =  揶
  -  心 + み/耳 + さ/阝  =  椰
  -  み/耳 + 龸  =  耽
  -  み/耳 + 火  =  耿
  -  み/耳 + へ/⺩  =  聖
  -  む/車 + み/耳 + へ/⺩  =  蟶
  -  み/耳 + こ/子  =  聡
  -  み/耳 + み/耳 + こ/子  =  聰
  -  み/耳 + ろ/十  =  聴
  -  み/耳 + み/耳 + ろ/十  =  聽
  -  み/耳 + 日  =  職
  -  み/耳 + ほ/方  =  聾
  -  ゆ/彳 + 宿 + み/耳  =  弭
  -  き/木 + れ/口 + み/耳  =  楫
  -  へ/⺩ + 宿 + み/耳  =  珥
  -  い/糹/#2 + 宿 + み/耳  =  緝
  -  み/耳 + 宿 + ん/止  =  耻
  -  み/耳 + 仁/亻 + ろ/十  =  聆
  -  み/耳 + 宿 + さ/阝  =  聊
  -  み/耳 + れ/口 + せ/食  =  聒
  -  み/耳 + 宿 + た/⽥  =  聘
  -  み/耳 + や/疒 + れ/口  =  聟
  -  み/耳 + う/宀/#3 + よ/广  =  聢
  -  み/耳 + 龸 + ゐ/幺  =  聨
  -  み/耳 + 宿 + ゐ/幺  =  聯
  -  み/耳 + 宿 + て/扌  =  聹
  -  む/車 + 宿 + み/耳  =  輒
  -  み/耳 + 龸 + せ/食  =  鵈

Compounds of 襄

  -  つ/土 + み/耳  =  壌
  -  つ/土 + つ/土 + み/耳  =  壤
  -  ふ/女 + み/耳  =  嬢
  -  ふ/女 + ふ/女 + み/耳  =  孃
  -  の/禾 + み/耳  =  穣
  -  の/禾 + の/禾 + み/耳  =  穰
  -  ゑ/訁 + み/耳  =  譲
  -  ゑ/訁 + ゑ/訁 + み/耳  =  讓
  -  せ/食 + み/耳  =  醸
  -  せ/食 + せ/食 + み/耳  =  釀
  -  日 + 宿 + み/耳  =  曩
  -  て/扌 + 宿 + み/耳  =  攘
  -  ね/示 + 宿 + み/耳  =  禳
  -  そ/馬 + 宿 + み/耳  =  驤

Compounds of 哉

  -  い/糹/#2 + み/耳  =  繊
  -  い/糹/#2 + い/糹/#2 + み/耳  =  纖
  -  る/忄 + み/耳  =  懺
  -  selector 1 + る/忄 + み/耳  =  懴
  -  ほ/方 + み/耳  =  殱
  -  ほ/方 + ほ/方 + み/耳  =  殲
  -  を/貝 + み/耳  =  賊
  -  み/耳 + い/糹/#2  =  截
  -  み/耳 + た/⽥  =  戴
  -  み/耳 + き/木  =  栽
  -  み/耳 + ね/示  =  裁
  -  み/耳 + む/車  =  載
  -  ふ/女 + 宿 + み/耳  =  孅
  -  ち/竹 + 龸 + み/耳  =  籖
  -  ち/竹 + 宿 + み/耳  =  籤
  -  い/糹/#2 + 龸 + み/耳  =  纎
  -  え/訁 + 宿 + み/耳  =  讖

Compounds of 禹

  -  れ/口 + み/耳  =  嘱
  -  れ/口 + れ/口 + み/耳  =  囑
  -  と/戸 + み/耳  =  属
  -  と/戸 + と/戸 + み/耳  =  屬
  -  め/目 + と/戸 + み/耳  =  矚
  -  み/耳 + ん/止 + の/禾  =  齲

Compounds of 呂

  -  仁/亻 + み/耳  =  侶
  -  龸 + み/耳  =  営
  -  龸 + 龸 + み/耳  =  營
  -  う/宀/#3 + み/耳  =  宮
  -  ま/石 + み/耳  =  麿
  -  き/木 + selector 6 + み/耳  =  梠
  -  も/門 + selector 6 + み/耳  =  閭
  -  心 + selector 6 + み/耳  =  櫚
  -  ち/竹 + selector 6 + み/耳  =  筥
  -  い/糹/#2 + selector 6 + み/耳  =  絽

Compounds of 身

  -  宿 + み/耳  =  窮
  -  み/耳 + し/巿  =  射
  -  え/訁 + み/耳  =  謝
  -  そ/馬 + み/耳 + し/巿  =  麝
  -  み/耳 + そ/馬  =  躾
  -  み/耳 + selector 1 + ゐ/幺  =  躱
  -  み/耳 + ゆ/彳 + selector 1  =  躬
  -  み/耳 + も/門 + selector 3  =  躯
  -  み/耳 + き/木 + selector 6  =  躰
  -  み/耳 + 龸 + よ/广  =  軅
  -  み/耳 + た/⽥ + と/戸  =  軆
  -  み/耳 + よ/广 + 心  =  軈

Compounds of 足

  -  な/亻 + み/耳  =  促
  -  み/耳 + れ/口  =  路
  -  ち/竹 + み/耳  =  露
  -  み/耳 + せ/食  =  鷺
  -  心 + み/耳 + れ/口  =  蕗
  -  み/耳 + ひ/辶  =  跛
  -  み/耳 + す/発  =  距
  -  み/耳 + え/訁  =  跡
  -  み/耳 + 宿  =  跳
  -  み/耳 + 囗  =  践
  -  み/耳 + み/耳 + 囗  =  踐
  -  み/耳 + つ/土  =  踊
  -  み/耳 + に/氵  =  踏
  -  み/耳 + ま/石  =  蹄
  -  み/耳 + ゐ/幺  =  蹊
  -  み/耳 + 仁/亻  =  蹴
  -  み/耳 + う/宀/#3  =  躁
  -  み/耳 + や/疒  =  躍
  -  み/耳 + を/貝  =  躓
  -  ひ/辶 + み/耳  =  蹙
  -  て/扌 + み/耳 + selector 2  =  捉
  -  う/宀/#3 + み/耳 + selector 2  =  蹇
  -  ん/止 + み/耳 + selector 2  =  齪
  -  み/耳 + selector 3 + け/犬  =  趺
  -  み/耳 + 龸 + ん/止  =  趾
  -  み/耳 + は/辶 + selector 2  =  跂
  -  み/耳 + ろ/十 + ゑ/訁  =  跋
  -  み/耳 + selector 6 + け/犬  =  跌
  -  み/耳 + ぬ/力 + れ/口  =  跏
  -  み/耳 + 宿 + ま/石  =  跖
  -  み/耳 + 宿 + へ/⺩  =  跚
  -  み/耳 + selector 3 + や/疒  =  跟
  -  み/耳 + つ/土 + 龸  =  跣
  -  み/耳 + 宿 + け/犬  =  跨
  -  み/耳 + く/艹 + さ/阝  =  跪
  -  み/耳 + 宿 + 龸  =  跫
  -  み/耳 + と/戸 + も/門  =  跼
  -  み/耳 + 宿 + は/辶  =  跿
  -  み/耳 + き/木 + 数  =  踈
  -  み/耳 + 比 + や/疒  =  踉
  -  み/耳 + た/⽥ + き/木  =  踝
  -  み/耳 + と/戸 + selector 1  =  踞
  -  み/耳 + 宿 + や/疒  =  踟
  -  み/耳 + う/宀/#3 + ね/示  =  踪
  -  み/耳 + 宿 + ゆ/彳  =  踰
  -  み/耳 + ぬ/力 + た/⽥  =  踴
  -  み/耳 + 龸 + り/分  =  踵
  -  み/耳 + き/木 + よ/广  =  蹂
  -  み/耳 + 宿 + ぬ/力  =  蹈
  -  み/耳 + そ/馬 + こ/子  =  蹉
  -  み/耳 + り/分 + お/頁  =  蹌
  -  み/耳 + ⺼ + 仁/亻  =  蹐
  -  み/耳 + た/⽥ + か/金  =  蹕
  -  み/耳 + へ/⺩ + を/貝  =  蹟
  -  み/耳 + よ/广 + と/戸  =  蹠
  -  み/耳 + 宿 + め/目  =  蹣
  -  み/耳 + ゆ/彳 + よ/广  =  蹤
  -  み/耳 + せ/食 + し/巿  =  蹲
  -  み/耳 + ん/止 + selector 1  =  蹶
  -  み/耳 + 宿 + な/亻  =  蹼
  -  み/耳 + selector 6 + ま/石  =  躄
  -  み/耳 + selector 4 + む/車  =  躅
  -  み/耳 + と/戸 + く/艹  =  躇
  -  み/耳 + へ/⺩ + し/巿  =  躊
  -  み/耳 + さ/阝 + 龸  =  躋
  -  み/耳 + 宿 + せ/食  =  躑
  -  み/耳 + 宿 + よ/广  =  躔
  -  み/耳 + 宿 + も/門  =  躙
  -  み/耳 + 宿 + み/耳  =  躡
  -  み/耳 + 龸 + も/門  =  躪

Compounds of 南

  -  み/耳 + け/犬  =  献
  -  み/耳 + み/耳 + け/犬  =  獻
  -  れ/口 + 比 + み/耳  =  喃
  -  心 + 比 + み/耳  =  楠
  -  ひ/辶 + 比 + み/耳  =  遖

Compounds of 緑

  -  ね/示 + み/耳  =  禄
  -  ね/示 + ね/示 + み/耳  =  祿
  -  か/金 + み/耳  =  録
  -  み/耳 + ぬ/力  =  剥

Other compounds

  -  み/耳 + の/禾  =  声
  -  み/耳 + み/耳 + の/禾  =  聲
  -  ま/石 + み/耳 + の/禾  =  磬
  -  え/訁 + み/耳 + の/禾  =  謦
  -  み/耳 + の/禾 + 日  =  馨
  -  み/耳 + ん/止  =  民
  -  や/疒 + み/耳 + ん/止  =  岷
  -  る/忄 + み/耳 + ん/止  =  愍
  -  ほ/方 + み/耳 + ん/止  =  氓
  -  に/氵 + み/耳 + ん/止  =  泯
  -  い/糹/#2 + み/耳 + ん/止  =  緡
  -  き/木 + み/耳  =  枕
  -  氷/氵 + み/耳  =  派
  -  ⺼ + み/耳  =  脈
  -  み/耳 + 宿 + の/禾  =  殷
  -  み/耳 + 宿 + 心  =  慇
  -  と/戸 + み/耳 + に/氵  =  鞜
  -  ま/石 + 宿 + み/耳  =  碌

Notes

Braille patterns